Stetson is a brand of hat.

Stetson may also refer to:

Places 
 Stetson University, a private, co-educational, liberal arts university
 Stetson Hatters, the university's athletic program
 Stetson University College of Law, Florida's first law school
 Stetson University Campus Historic District, a U.S. Historic District located in DeLand, Florida
 Stetson, Maine, a town in Penobscot County, Maine
 Stetson (crater), the remains of a crater on the far side of the Moon
 John B. Stetson House, a historic home in DeLand, Florida
 Stetson Bowl, a stadium in Surrey, British Columbia
 Stetson Hall, the former town hall of Randolph, Massachusetts
 Stetson House, a historic house in Hanover, Massachusetts
 Stetson Mountain
 Stetson Pond (Pembroke, Massachusetts)
 Stetson School, a private residential institution

Business 
 John B. Stetson Company, the maker of the Stetson cowboy style hats
 Stetson, a fragrance line manufactured by Coty, Inc. under license from the John B. Stetson Company

People 
 Stetson Allie (born 1991), American professional baseball pitcher
 Stetson Bennett (born 1998), American football player
 Stetson Kennedy (1916–2011), author and human rights activist
 John B. Stetson (1830–1906), hat manufacturer
 Andrew Stetson (born 1979), Canadian supermodel
 Augusta Emma Stetson (1842–1928), American Christian Science leader
 Beth Stetson, American economist
 Bill Stetson, American businessman, film producer, and environmental policy advisor
 Caleb Stetson (1801–1885), American businessman and politician
 Charles Stetson (1801–1863), politician
 Charles Walter Stetson (1858–1911), American artist
 Colin Stetson (born 1975), American saxophonist and multireedist
 Dave Stetson (born 1946), co-creator and founding member of the Caricature Carvers of America
 Francis Lynde Stetson (1846–1920), American lawyer
 George Stetson (1814–1879), Christian pastor
 Glenn Stetson (1940–2003), Canadian singer, concert promoter, and television producer
 Harlan True Stetson (1885–1964), American astronomer and physicist
 Jane Watson Stetson, American political operative
 Jeff Stetson, American writer
 John C. Stetson (1920–2007), United States Secretary of the Air Force
 Kent Stetson (born 1948), Canadian playwright and member of the Order of Canada
 Lee Stetson, academic
 Lemuel Stetson (1804–1868), United States Representative from New York
 Mark Stetson (born 1952), visual effects artist
 Nahum Stetson (1807–1894), businessman
 Nancy Stetson, diplomat
 Raymond Herbert Stetson (died 1950), American speech scientist at Oberlin College
 Ricky Stetson
 Robert Stetson Macfarlane (1899–?), president of Northern Pacific Railway 1951–1966
 Steve Stetson (born 1951), head college football coach
 Tony Stetson (born 1959), professional wrestler
 William H. Stetson (?–2019), Roman Catholic priest

Other uses 

 Stetson, Street Dog of Park City, a short film adapted from a children's book
 The Stetsons, Australian country and western band

English-language surnames